Meran (Italian Merano) is a spa city and comune in South Tyrol, northern Italy.

Meran may also refer to:
 Duchy of Merania or Meran, Adriatic fiefdom of the Holy Roman Empire from 1152 until 1248
 Franz, Count of Meran (1839–1891), Austrian noble, and his heirs
 Marcel Meran, French sailor at the 1900 Olympics
 Meran Variation, chess Semi-Slav Defense variation

See also
 Merano (disambiguation)
 Lake Meran, Victoria, Australia